Mariyala is a village in Chamarajanagar district of Karnataka state, India.

Location
Mariyala is located at 4.8 kilometer northwest of Chamarajanagar town.

Transportation
Mariyala is served by Mariyala Gangavadi railway station. The village is on the highway between Chamarajanagar and Mysore.

Post Offices
 Mariyala: 571313.
 Gangavadi: 571441.

Demographics
2,255 people live in the village in 591 families.  The literacy rate is 55%. The village is ruled by a sarpanch.

Education
 Government Primary School, Mariyala is at the very beginning of the village directly opposite to the village temple. 
 There is a new private P.U.College at the end of the village.
 JSS Institute, Mariyala gives training to become electricians, fitters, electronics mechanics etc.  The trainees are assisted for placements through SJCE Mysore.

See also
Kavalande
Badanaguppe
Chamarajanagar
Mukkadahalli

 Kellamballi

Image Gallery

References

Villages in Chamarajanagar district